Galeya (Garea) is a dialectically diverse Austronesian language spoken in the D'Entrecasteaux Islands of Papua New Guinea.

References

External links 
 Paradisec open access word list including Galeya

Nuclear Papuan Tip languages
Languages of Milne Bay Province
D'Entrecasteaux Islands